The Danmarksturneringen i kvindefodbold (shortened to Kvinde-DM, or simply DM) is a women's association football league tournament in Denmark, comprising the top three nation-wide semi-professional and amateur divisions of the Danish football league system. The women's national league system was established by the Danish FA in 1975, following the discontinuation of the end-of-the season knock-out tournament format for the women's national championship after two editions (1973–1974). The first season, 1975 Danmarksturneringen i damefodbold, involved twenty teams — that had qualified through the regional football league championships — split equally into two geographically divided groups with the two group winners progressing to a national championship final. A combined nation-wide first division was introduced in 1981, a second division was implemented in 1993 and a third division was added in 2021. Initially formed as an amateur tournament, professionalism was legalized and restricted to the Danmarksturneringen in July 1997, with the first semi-professional player contracts in Danish women's football being signed by Fortuna Hjørring og Frederiksberg BK. The tournament have always been organized by the Danish FA. The clubs finishing bottom of the Danmarksturneringen's basement division have since the 1981-season been relegated to the Kvindeserien, the highest level of women's amateur football in the country.

The list includes clubs that are current members of the Danmarksturneringen, those who lost their Danmarksturneringen status upon relegation, and those which lost their status by other means. This includes clubs which have become defunct, merged or created superstructures with one or several neighbouring clubs, or have been relegated to a lower non-league position in the national league pyramid. Where a defunct club has been succeeded by a phoenix club, the new club is listed. If a club now only fields youth teams and no senior women's teams, the club's senior women's department is listed as inactive.

Member clubs
The table shows the first and last seasons in which each club competed in a division part of the Danmarksturneringen including the total number of Kvinde-DM seasons and a summary of the seasons spent in the top flight division. Some clubs' membership was intermittent between their first and last seasons. The current name of the club's senior women's squad and/or professional branch is listed even though the name might differ from the actual period in which the team took part in the Danmarksturneringen – the footnotes detail relevant changes in the club's history. Their affiliation to a regional football association and current division status is also mentioned, highlighting whether the individual clubs are participating in the current season of the Danmarksturneringen, playing at a lower ranking non-league level, have transformed to become a reserve team, or have become defunct or inactive due to a merger, superstructure at senior level or were dissolved.

As of the 2021–22 season, a total of 120 different teams have competed in the Danmarksturneringen since its inception, including sixteen (semi-professional) superstructures involving multiple clubs, sixty-one now defunct or inactive senior women's teams and six reserve squads. In the 1996 season, AC Ballerup became the first superstructure to partake in the Danmarksturneringen. Reserve teams were allowed in the second division beginning from the 2017–18 season, with Fortuna Hjørring (2) and VSK Aarhus (2) and Kolding BK (KoldingQ reserves) being the first reserve squads in the league tournament. With the addition of the third division in 2021–22 season, the highest level for reserve teams were downgraded to the third tier. Seventy-four different teams have participated in the top flight league. Fortuna Hjørring remain the only club to have participated in all editions (47) of the Danmarksturneringen i kvindefodbold, while also being the club with most seasons (46) in the top-flight league. The reserve team of KoldingQ only partook in the second division between July and October 2021, before being merged into the newly established Kolding IF Women. Vildbjerg SF have had the most league seasons (12) in the Danmarksturneringen without ever having played in the top division. Being the largest regional football association, the Jutland FA have had the highest number of member clubs complete in the Danmarksturneringen.

Overview has been updated to include the 2021–22 season. A season is regarded as one year long.

Footnotes

References

 
Denmark alphabetical
Football clubs
Football club
Football